getAbstract, founded in 1999, is a Swiss and US-based corporation that summarizes books, videos, articles, and other content for business customers.

The summaries are available in English, German, Spanish, Russian, Chinese, French and Portuguese.

getAbstract was co-founded in 1999 by Thomas Bergen, Patrick Brigger, and Rolf Dobelli.  getAbstract employs business journalists to create its content.

getAbstract is not affiliated with any publishing house, however, it does have a network of more than 500 publishing partners.

getAbstract's competitors include Sumizeit.com, Blinkist.com, and Instaread.com

References

External links
getAbstract website
getAbstract’s German website

Subscription services
1999 establishments in Switzerland
Companies based in Lucerne